Prince of Chaos is a fantasy novel by American writer  Roger Zelazny, the final book in The Chronicles of Amber series.

Plot summary
Merlin finds himself summoned back to the land where he was raised, the Courts of Chaos. He finds himself enmeshed in political intrigues and schemes, and himself much closer to the crown than he believed possible, or wants. He encounters a variety of old acquaintances, and finds himself fighting with both his wits and his magic to avoid the snares laid for him, to help his friends, and to discover his father's fate.

The Chronicles of Amber books
American fantasy novels
1991 American novels
1991 fantasy novels
William Morrow and Company books